Yacolt  is a town in Clark County, Washington, United States. The 2019 population is estimated to be 1,796. It is located about 31 miles northeast of Vancouver which is part of the Portland-Vancouver metropolitan area.

History
Yacolt is derived from the Klickitat word "Yahkohtl," meaning "haunted place" or "place of (evil) spirits." Another name it was known by was "the valley of lost children".  In September 1902 the town, which consisted of only 15 buildings at the time, was nearly destroyed by the Yacolt Burn, the largest fire in state history. Yacolt was rebuilt over time and officially incorporated on July 31, 1908.

Geography
Yacolt is located at  (45.865506, -122.407028).

Notable residents

Tonya Harding, figure skater

Demographics

2010 census
As of the census of 2010, there were 1,566 people, 454 households, and 384 families living in the town. The racial makeup of the town was 95.8% White, 0.5% African American, 1.1% Native American, 0.4% Asian, 0.2% from other races, and 2.0% from two or more races. Hispanic or Latino of any race were 2.1% of the population.

There were 454 households, of which 55.3% had children under the age of 18 living with them, 68.3% were married couples living together, 8.4% had a female householder with no husband present, 7.9% had a male householder with no wife present, and 15.4% were non-families. 10.8% of all households were made up of individuals, and 3.7% had someone living alone who was 65 years of age or older. The average household size was 3.45 and the average family size was 3.68.

The median age in the town was 25 years. 38.6% of residents were under the age of 18; 11.4% were between the ages of 18 and 24; 27.9% were from 25 to 44; 17% were from 45 to 64; and 5% were 65 years of age or older. The gender makeup of the town was 50.9% male and 49.1% female.

2000 census
As of the census of 2000, there were 1,055 people, 319 households, and 256 families living in the town. The population density was 2,075.2 people per square mile (798.7/km2). There were 344 housing units at an average density of 676.7 per square mile (260.4/km2). The racial makeup of the town was 95.26% White, 0.47% African American, 1.14% Native American, 0.38% Asian, 0.09% from other races, and 2.65% from two or more races. Hispanic or Latino of any race were 1.90% of the population. 22.1% were of American, 17.9% German, 8.6% English, 7.0% Norwegian, and 5.2% Irish ancestry.

There were 319 households, out of which 54.5% had children under the age of 18 living with them, 63.9% were married couples living together, 11.6% had a female householder with no husband present, and 19.7% were non-families. 16.0% of all households were made up of individuals, and 6.3% had someone living alone who was 65 years of age or older. The average household size was 3.31 and the average family size was 3.71.

In the town, the population was spread out, with 40.2% under the age of 18, 8.2% from 18 to 24, 30.6% from 25 to 44, 13.4% from 45 to 64, and 7.6% who were 65 years of age or older. The median age was 26 years. For every 100 females, there were 106.9 males. For every 100 females age 18 and over, there were 99.7 males.

The median income for a household in the town was $39,444, and the median income for a family was $43,438. Males had a median income of $37,500 versus $24,306 for females. The per capita income for the town was $12,529. About 6.4% of families and 7.8% of the population were below the poverty line, including 8.8% of those under age 18 and 11.1% of those age 65 or over.

References

External links
 

Towns in Clark County, Washington
Towns in Washington (state)
1908 establishments in Washington (state)